Nicholas Close (died 1452) was an English priest.

Close is widely regarded as having been born in Westmorland, in Birkbeck Fells, but may have been of Flemish descent. He was educated at King's College, Cambridge, being elected a fellow in 1443, one of the first six fellows on the foundation. He held the curacy of St John Zachary, a church demolished to make way for King's College Chapel, the construction of which he was appointed overseer by Henry VI.

He served as a commissioner to Scotland in 1449. He was provided to the see of Carlisle in January 1450, and consecrated on 15 March 1450. On 19 March he was granted an indult from the King "for life and as long as he is bishop of Carlisle, to visit his city and diocese by deputy (he being hindered so much by the service of Henry, king of England that he cannot conveniently do so in person)."

Also in 1450 he was elected to the then annual position of Chancellor of the University of Cambridge. He was Bishop of Carlisle from 1450 to 1452, and was then translated to Bishop of Coventry and Lichfield on 30 August 1452, serving for a short time before his death in late October 1452.

Citations

References

 

Chancellors of the University of Cambridge
Year of birth missing
1452 deaths
15th-century English Roman Catholic bishops
Alumni of King's College, Cambridge
Fellows of King's College, Cambridge
Bishops of Carlisle
Bishops of Coventry and Lichfield
Archdeacons of Colchester